SS Arabic may refer to:

 
 , an ocean liner sunk by German submarine  on 19 August 1915
 , the former SS Berlin; renamed Arabic in 1920; broken up in 1930

See also
 Arabic (disambiguation)

Ship names